This is a list of awards, recognitions, achievements and nominations received by Kathryn Bernardo during her career.

International Awards and Recognitions

Face of the Year Awards

Kids' Choice Awards

The Independent Critics

The World Around Us

FHM U.K.

Philippine Government Awards

Iligan Youth Choice Awards

Gawad Parangal sa Natatanging Anak ng Kabanatuan

Film and Television

Film Development Council of the Philippines

FAMAS Awards

PMPC Star Award for Movies

Entertainment Editors' Choice Awards for Movies

GMMSF Box-Office Entertainment Awards

Anak TV Awards

EdukCircle Awards

PMPC Star Awards for Television

Inding Indie Short Film Festival

Paragon Critics Choice Awards

Metro Manila Film Festival

Recognition from the Academe

Comguild Academe's Choice Awards

Aral Parangal Awards - Young Educators' Convergence of Soccksargen

Biliran Province State University BiPSU Media Awards

University of Perpetual Help System DALTA: Alta Media Icon Awards

Trinity University of Asia: Platinum Stallion Media Awards

Kabantugan Awards (Mindanao State University-General Santos City)

Northwest Samar State University Choice Awards For Radio & Television

Gawad Bedista

Golden Laurel LPU Batangas Media Awards

Gawad Lasallianeta

Guild of Educators, Mentors and Students - Hiyas ng Sining

Lyceum of the Philippines Kung Gihan

Music

Myx Music Awards

Popularity and Commerciality

ASAP Pop Teen Choice Awards

ASAP Pop Viewers Choice Awards

Push Awards

Star Cinema Online Awards

Yahoo! Philippines OMG! Awards

Accolades From Media

Candy Readers Choice Awards

Candy Style Awards

Kakulay Teen Choice Awards

PEP List PEPsters Choice & Editors’ Choice Awards

Rappler Social Media Awards

LionhearTV

RAWR Awards

StarStudio Celebrity Style Awards

FMTM Awards for TV Entertainment Section

Philippine Edition Network for Movie Awards

Philippine Edition Network for Television Awards

Inside Showbiz People's Choice Awards

VP Choice Awards

Other uses

Yes! Magazine

FHM Rankings

Star Magic Ball Awards

Black Magic Halloween Party

Star Magic Sportfest

NBS Fan Favorites

Metro Society

Rogue Magazine

References 

Bernardo, Kathryn
Lists of awards received by Filipino actor